Gabriel Dupuy (5 February 1840, Angouleme – 5 February 1913, Bordeaux) 
was a French entomologist who specialised in Lepidoptera.

Depuy taught at École nationale d'Agriculture de Montpellier (Hérault). He studied the butterflies and moths of France notably Charente, Deux-Sèvres, Dordogne and Gironde.

He was a Member of  the Société Entomologique de France.

References	
Oberthür, C. 1916: [Brown, F. R. F.] Etudes de lepidopterologie comparée 11	

French lepidopterists
1840 births
1913 deaths
People from Angoulême
19th-century French zoologists
20th-century French zoologists